Uzra Zeya is an American diplomat who has served as the Under Secretary of State for Civilian Security, Democracy, and Human Rights in the Biden Administration since July 2021.

Early life and education 
Zeya was born in Chapel Hill, North Carolina, to immigrants from Bihar, India. Zeya's sister, Rena Golden (née Rena Shaheen Zeya), died in 2013 due to lymphoma. Zeya graduated from the School of Foreign Service at Georgetown University.

Career 

Uzra Zeya worked as a diplomat in the U.S. Foreign Service for 27 years. During the Obama administration, Zeya served as the acting assistant Secretary and principal deputy assistant secretary in the Bureau of Democracy, Human Rights, and Labor. She also worked in the Embassy of the United States, Paris from 2014 to 2017.
In 2013, Zeya was suspected to have been involved in the arrest of Indian diplomat Devyani Khobragade. Zeya was accused of helping evacuate the domestic help's kin out of India, just two days prior to Khobragade's arrest.

In 2018, Zeya wrote in Politico wrote that she left the State Department after not being promoted because she did not pass the Trump administration's "Breitbart test" due to her race and gender.

In 2018, Zeya joined Albright Stonebridge Group as Senior Advisor.

From 2019 through 2021, Zeya served as the President and CEO of the Alliance for Peacebuilding, a network of organizations working to end violent conflict worldwide.

Biden administration

President Biden nominated Zeya to be Under Secretary of State for Civilian Security, Democracy, and Human Rights in early 2021. Hearings were held before the Senate Foreign Relations Committee on the nomination on April 15, 2021. The committee favorably reported the nomination to the Senate floor on April 21, 2021. Zeya was confirmed on July 13, 2021, by a vote of 73-24.

Zeya assumed office on July 14, 2021.

Tenure
On December 20, 2021, Zeya was designated by Secretary of State Antony Blinken to serve concurrently as the United States Special Coordinator for Tibetan Issues, effective immediately. Zeya met with Tibetan exile leader Penpa Tsering in Washington, D.C., on April 25, 2022, in the first of a series of meetings to promote freedoms in Tibet.

Personal life
Zeya speaks Arabic, French, and Spanish.

References

External links

American women diplomats
American diplomats
Obama administration personnel
Biden administration personnel
Walsh School of Foreign Service alumni
United States Department of State publications
United States Under Secretaries of State
Year of birth missing (living people)
Living people
People from Chapel Hill, North Carolina